Wetzler is a surname. Notable people with the name include:

Alfréd Wetzler (1918–1988), Austro-Hungarian writer
Ben Wetzler (born 1991), American baseball pitcher 
Gwen Wetzler, American producer, director and animator

See also
Wetzler Symphony Orchestra, American orchestra
Vrba–Wetzler report, is a 40-page document about the Auschwitz concentration camp in German-occupied Poland during the Holocaust